Precis octavia, the gaudy commodore, is a species of butterfly in the family Nymphalidae. It is native to Africa.

Description
Precis octavia was first described by Pieter Cramer in 1777. The nominate subspecies (Precis octavia octavia)  flies from West Africa, through Cameroun, Gabon, Republic of Central Africa, Republic of Congo, Democratic Republic of the Congo, north to Sudan, Ethiopia, Somalia and Zimbabwe. It has a wet season form, which is orange with a pinkish flush and black markings on the upperside, and a dry season form which is shining blue with a vivid red band on the hindwing. In his authoritative 2-vol. book "Butterflies of West Africa", Torben B. Larsen states "I believe this species has the most spectacular seasonal dimorphism of any butterfly, and the two morphs were [first] described as distinct species."

The southern subspecies (Precis octavia sesamus) also has two seasonal forms: a summer form (natalensis) which is red with black markings, and a winter form (sesamus) which is blue with a line of red markings on the wings. The winter form is slightly larger than the summer form. In both forms the males and females are alike, however the females are slightly larger. 

Intermediate forms of the gaudy commodore are rare in nature, but can readily be produced in conditions created during captive breeding, displaying a wide range of mixtures of the wing patterns of both forms.

Distribution
The nominate northern subspecies (Precis octavia octavia) occurs from eastern Senegal, Guinea, Burkina Faso, Sierra Leone, Liberia, Ghana, Togo, Benin, Nigeria, Cameroon, Gabon, Congo, northern and central DRC, CAR, South Sudan, Ethiopia, Somalia.

The southern subspecies of these butterflies (Precis octavia sesamus) is found from the border region of the Eastern and Western Cape in South Africa and along the eastern side of South Africa, to Eswatini, Mozambique, Tanzania and Kenya.

Life cycle

Eggs
The eggs are tiny, rounded, green domes with ribs running up the sides.

Larvae
The larvae are variable; orange, or orange with black bands, or almost completely black. The final-instar larvae are black when reared at the lower temperatures associated with the winter form, and bright orange when reared at the slightly higher summer temperatures.

Larval food plants are Lamiaceae including Coleus species, Plastostema species, Plectranthus esculentus, Plectranthus fruticosus, Rabdosiella calycina, Pycnostachys reticulata, Pycnostachys urticifolia, and Solenostemon species.

Pupae
The pupae hang upside down and have a knobbly appearance.

By keeping the pupae at different temperatures (warmer or cooler), the two forms of the adults can be produced, while maintaining pupae at "boundary" temperatures produces transitional forms.

Adults
The adults feed on nectar and have a year-round flight period. Regional timing of the onset of dry and wet seasons determines the flight times of the respective wet and dry forms in the nominate subspecies, Precis octavia octavia, which is prevalent in West Africa through Central to north-eastern Africa. The dry season form is expressed as the winter form in the southern subspecies Precis octavia sesame which flies from March to September. The wet season form is expressed in the south as the summer form flying from October to March.

The two seasonal forms are not only different in appearance, but also display different behaviour:

In the nominate subspecies, Precis octavia octavia, the dry season form tends to fly less actively than the more territorial wet season form, and is often quiescent in discreet hiding places even under eaves or indoors. It tends to wander towards the forest zone where it may breed seasonally rather than year-round.

Amongst the southern subspecies, Precis octavius sesamus, the males of the summer form display conspicuous hilltopping, and show both territorial and perching behavior. They fly between one and two meters off the ground with a medium-fast "flap-flap-glide" motion. They are often found in grasslands.

The male winter form rarely hilltops, has a random flight pattern, and is often found near forests. In cold weather, the winter form hibernates in holes or under overhanging rocks. Up to 35 individuals may gather together in these places.

The summer and winter form have been seen mating with each other.

Subspecies
Precis octavia octavia 
Range: eastern Senegal, Guinea, Burkina Faso, Sierra Leone, Liberia, Ghana, Togo, Benin, Nigeria, Cameroon, Gabon, Congo, CAR, South Sudan, Ethiopia, Somalia, northern and central DRC
Precis octavia sesamus Trimen, 1883 
Range: Uganda, Angola, southern and eastern DRC, Kenya to Zambia, Mozambique, Zimbabwe, Botswana, northern Namibia, South Africa and Eswatini

References

Junoniini
Butterflies of Africa
Butterflies described in 1777